Belafonte on Campus is an album by Harry Belafonte, released in 1967.

Track listing 
 "Roll On, Buddy" (Traditional) – 2:45	 
 "The Hands I Love" (Gordon Lightfoot) – 4:57	 
 "The Last Thing on My Mind" (Tom Paxton) – 3:47	 
 "Delia" (Fred Brooks, Lester Judson) – 3:42	 
 "The Far Side of the Hill" (Vicki Arnold) – 3:30	 
 "Waly, Waly (False Love)" – 4:43	 
 "Sail Away Ladies" (Traditional, Bill Eaton) – 3:21	 
 "The First Time Ever I Saw Your Face" (Ewan MacColl) – 3:37	 
 "Hold On to Me Babe" (Paxton) – 3:40	 
 "Those Three Are on My Mind" – 3:43	 
 "The Dog Song" (James Bevel, Bernard Lafayette) – 4:25

Personnel 
 Harry Belafonte – vocals
 Al Schackman – guitar
 Ernie Calabria – guitar
 Bill Salter – bass
 Percy Brice – drums
 Ralph MacDonald – percussion
 Auchee Lee – percussion
 Arranged and conducted by Bill Eaton
Production notes:
 Andy Wiswell – producer
 Bob Simpson – engineer
 William Attaway – liner notes

Chart positions

References 

1967 albums
Harry Belafonte albums
RCA Records albums